Gerald Abraham (born July 4, 1965) is a former American football player who played running back & fullback professionally for the Denver Broncos, Philadelphia Eagles  & Kansas City Chiefs of the NFL, as well as wide receiver/linebacker for the Denver Dynamite of the Arena Football League. He played college football at Wyoming

At Wyoming, Abraham played fullback and running back and was Wyoming's all-time leading rusher at the time.

In 1991, Abraham was named to the active roster of the Denver Dynamite. He played wide receiver/linebacker.

Abraham is currently the program director for the Denver PAL

References

Further reading
 COLLEGE FOOTBALL : Far West Roundup : Wyoming Shakes Up BYU, 29-27, Los Angeles Times, October 11, 1987

1965 births
Denver Dynamite (arena football) players
Living people
Wyoming Cowboys football players